Thomas Fitzjames (c. 1624 – 1705) was an English politician who sat in the House of Commons  in 1659 and 1660.

Fitzjames was the son of Leweston Fitzjames of Leweston, Dorset. He matriculated at Lincoln College, Oxford on 25 January 1639, aged 16. He was called to the bar at Middle Temple in 1649. 

In 1659, Fitzjames was elected Member of Parliament for Downton in the Third Protectorate Parliament. He was then of Nurfland. In April 1660 he was re-elected MP for Downton in the Convention Parliament but as there was a double return, his election was declared void on 9 May. 
 
Fitzjames was the brother of Henry Fitzjames and John Fitzjames.

References

1624 births
1705 deaths
Politicians from Dorset
Alumni of Lincoln College, Oxford
Members of the Middle Temple
People from Downton, Wiltshire
English MPs 1659
English MPs 1660